The 2011 williamhill.com UK Championship was a professional ranking snooker tournament that took place between 3–11 December 2011 at the Barbican Centre in York, England. This was the first time that William Hill sponsored the event.

John Higgins was the defending champion, but he lost in the second round 4–6 against Stephen Maguire.

Judd Trump won his second ranking title by defeating Mark Allen 10–8 in the final.

Prize fund
The breakdown of prize money for this year is shown below:

Winner: £100,000
Runner-up: £46,000
Semi-final: £23,250
Quarter-final: £16,450
Last 16: £12,050
Last 32: £8,750
Last 48: £5,500
Last 64: £2,300

Stage one highest break: £5,000
Stage two highest break: £500
Total: £625,000

Controversy
The format of the 2011 UK Championship was changed from previous editions. All rounds up to the quarter-finals were played as best of 11 frames instead of best of 17 frames. The semi-finals and the final were played as best of 17 and best of 19 frames respectively. The changes allowed for every match in the early rounds to be played in front of television cameras and avoided the need to use two extra tables. However, the changes angered some players including John Higgins, and Mark Williams, while Mark Allen called for Barry Hearn to resign as head of World Snooker, after Hearn had promised not to alter the championship when he had become the chairman in 2010. During the same interview Allen aimed a four lettered expletive at Hearn. Allen was later charged by World Snooker for bringing the game into disrepute. Hearn, following the original comments by Allen, called him a "silly little boy", to which Allen responded by gagging himself at a press conference. Allen and Hearn later sat down and had a discussion, which resolved their differences, while Allen was fined £250 for swearing in a press conference.

Main draw

Final

Qualifying
These matches were held between 5 and 9 November 2011 at the South West Snooker Academy, Gloucester, England.

Preliminary round
Best of 11 frames

Round 1–4

Century breaks

Televised stage centuries
 

 144, 134, 122  Stephen Maguire
 141, 139, 129, 125, 101  Mark Allen
 140, 136  Matthew Stevens
 133, 123, 101  Martin Gould
 133, 103  Ding Junhui
 131  Marco Fu
 128  Stuart Bingham
 127, 124  Ricky Walden
 123, 114  Ronnie O'Sullivan
 120, 109, 106, 106  Judd Trump

 118  Dominic Dale
 117  Graeme Dott
 111, 102  Mark Selby
 105, 101  Neil Robertson
 103  Stephen Lee
 102  Matthew Selt
 102  Shaun Murphy
 101  Marcus Campbell
 101  John Higgins

Qualifying stage centuries
 

 139  David Hogan
 134, 100  Sam Baird
 130  Jamie Jones
 127  Ian McCulloch
 127  Ryan Day
 126  Robin Hull
 124  Mark Joyce
 123  Fergal O'Brien
 122  Mark Davis
 121  Li Yan
 118  Ben Woollaston
 117  Adam Wicheard
 117  David Grace
 111  Lucky Vatnani
 110  Rory McLeod

 110  Robert Milkins
 109  Daniel Wells
 109  Jamie Cope
 109  Peter Lines
 108  Anthony McGill
 108  Ricky Walden
 106  Luca Brecel
 106  Jimmy Robertson
 104  Gerard Greene
 103  Aditya Mehta
 103  Jimmy White
 102  Sam Craigie
 102  David Gilbert
 100  Tian Pengfei

References

External links

2011
2011 in snooker
2011 in English sport
December 2011 sports events in the United Kingdom